The Peel Sessions was the 1988 EP release of the session The Cure recorded on 4 December 1978 for BBC Radio 1's John Peel show. The session was broadcast on 11 December 1978. The recordings were released on 12" vinyl, CD and cassette in 1988. Music journalist Jeff Apter has called the session "just the seal of credibility the band needed".

The EP reached number 7 on the UK Independent Singles Chart.

Track listing 
All songs were written by Smith, Tolhurst and Dempsey.
 "Killing an Arab" – 2:31
 "10.15 Saturday Night" – 3:48
 "Fire in Cairo" – 3:20
 "Boys Don't Cry" – 2:47

References 

The Cure EPs
Cure
1988 live albums
1988 EPs
Live EPs
Strange Fruit Records EPs
Albums produced by Tony Wilson